Sukli railway station serves Sukli and surrounding villages in Bhandara district of Madhya Pradesh, India.

References

Railway stations in Balaghat district
Nagpur SEC railway division